Jiří Baum (20 September 1900 – 1944, Warsaw) was a Czech zoologist, museum curator, explorer and writer. He served as the collector of the zoological department of the National Museum in Prague and is best known in his field for his 1933 book Through the African Wilderness and his 1935 zoological expedition in the Australian outback. In Australia, Baum teamed with Walter Drowley Filmer due to his local expertise with spiders. One species of New-Guinean troglobitic cockroach Nocticola baumi was named in 2021 on honour of Jiří Baum.

See also

References

External links
 Photo of Jiri Baum

1900 births
1944 deaths
20th-century Czech people
Czechoslovak zoologists
20th-century explorers
Czech explorers
Czech male writers
Czech resistance members
Resistance members killed by Nazi Germany
Scientists from Prague